Anwar Rahman (born 23 September 1996) is a Malaysian cricketer. He played in the 2014 ICC World Cricket League Division Five tournament. In April 2018, he was named in Malaysia's squad for the 2018 ICC World Cricket League Division Four tournament, also in Malaysia.

In August 2018, he was named in Malaysia's squad for the 2018 Asia Cup Qualifier tournament. In October 2018, he was named in Malaysia's squad in the Eastern sub-region group for the 2018–19 ICC World Twenty20 Asia Qualifier tournament. He was the leading wicket-taker for Singapore in the tournament, with ten dismissals in six matches.

In June 2019, he was named in Malaysia's squad for the 2019 Malaysia Tri-Nation Series tournament. He made his Twenty20 International (T20I) debut for Malayasia, against the Maldives, on 25 June 2019, taking a wicket with his first delivery. In September 2019, he was named in Malaysia's squad for the 2019 Malaysia Cricket World Cup Challenge League A tournament. He made his List A debut for Malaysia, against Denmark, in the Cricket World Cup Challenge League A tournament on 16 September 2019.

References

External links
 

1996 births
Living people
Malaysian cricketers
Malaysia Twenty20 International cricketers
Place of birth missing (living people)
Southeast Asian Games gold medalists for Malaysia
Southeast Asian Games silver medalists for Malaysia
Southeast Asian Games medalists in cricket
Competitors at the 2017 Southeast Asian Games